Kennedy Creek is a stream in Mason and 
Thurston counties in the U.S. state of Washington. It is a tributary to the Totten Inlet.

Kennedy Creek has the name of Franklin Kennedy, a local judge.

References

Rivers of Mason County, Washington
Rivers of Thurston County, Washington
Rivers of Washington (state)